Richard Wolfgang Semon (22 August 1859, in Berlin – 27 December 1918, in Munich) was a German zoologist, explorer, evolutionary biologist, a memory researcher who believed in the inheritance of acquired characteristics and applied this to social evolution. He is known for coining the terms engram and ecphory.

Australia
Before taking up his appointment at the University of Jena, he spent three years travelling around Australia; and the Indonesian Archipelago and, as a consequence, he was one of a number of influential German-speaking residents  such as William Blandowski, Ludwig Becker, Hermann Beckler, Amalie Dietrich, Diedrich Henne, Gerard Krefft, Johann Luehmann, Johann Menge, Ludwig Preiss, Carl Ludwig Christian Rümker (a.k.a. Ruemker), Moritz Richard Schomburgk, George Ulrich, Eugene von Guérard, Robert von Lendenfeld, Ferdinand von Mueller, Georg von Neumayer, and Carl Wilhelmi  who brought their "epistemic traditions" to Australia, and not only became "deeply entangled with the Australian colonial project", but also "intricately involved in imagining, knowing and shaping colonial Australia" (Barrett, et al., 2018, p.2).

Thesis
Semon proposed psycho-physiological parallelism according to which every psychological state corresponds to alterations in the nerves. His ideas of the mneme (based on the Greek goddess, Mneme, the muse of memory) were developed early in the 20th century.  The mneme represented the memory of an external-to-internal experience.  The resulting "mnemic trace" (or "engram") would be revived when an element resembling a component of the original complex of stimuli was encountered. Semon’s mnemic principle was based upon how stimuli produce a "permanent record,... written or engraved on the irritable substance", i.e. upon cellular material energetically predisposed to such inscription. According to historian Petteri Pietikainen:
Semon argued not only that information is encoded into memory and that there are 'memory traces' (engrams) or after-effects of stimulation that conserve the changes in the nervous system, he also contended that these changes in the brain (that is, engrams) are inherited. Semon's mneme-theory fell into disrepute largely because in a Lamarckian fashion it proposed that memory units are passed from one generation to another.
Semon was a proponent of the theory of organic memory, which was popular amongst biologists and psychologists from 1870 to 1918. The theory later lost scientific legitimacy as it yielded no reliable data and advances in genetics made the theory untenable.

Evidence
Semon found evidence in the way that different parts of the body relate to each other involuntarily, such as "reflex spasms, co-movements, sensory radiations," to infer distribution of "engraphic influence." He also took inventive recourse to phonography, the "mneme machine," to explain the uneven distribution and revival of engrams.

Semon's book, Die Mneme, influenced the Mnemosyne project of the idiosyncratic art historian Aby Warburg. N.B.: Semon's Mneme should not be confused with meme, a separate concept coined by Richard Dawkins.

Death
In 1918 in Munich, shortly after the end of World War I, Semon committed suicide wrapped in a German flag allegedly because he was depressed by Germany's role and defeat in that war and by the death of his wife.

Legacy
Semon is commemorated in the scientific name of a species of green-blooded skink (Prasinohaema semoni), and an Acantocephalan (Australiformis semoni).

Notes

References

 Anon (1895), "The Ceratodus: a German Scientist's Work", The Queenslander, (Saturday, 30 March 1895), p.597: in part, refers to Semon (1894).
 Barrett, L., Eckstein, L., Hurley, A.W. & Schwarz A. (2018), "Remembering German-Australian Colonial Entanglement: An Introduction", Postcolonial Studies, Vol.21, No.1, (January 2018), pp.1-5. 
 Beolens, B., Watkins, M. & Grayson, M. (2011), "Semon", p.240, in B. Beolens, M. Watkins, & M. Grayson (eds.), The Eponym Dictionary of Reptiles. Baltimore, MD: Johns Hopkins University Press. .
 
 

 Landsberg, A. (2004), Prosthetic Memory: The Transformation of American Remembrance in the Age of Mass Culture, New York, NY: Columbia University Press. 
  (includes a summary, an actualization and extension of the Semonian theory of memory)
 Pietikainen, P. (2007), Alchemists of Human Nature: Psychological Utopianism in Gross, Jung, Reich and Fromm, London: Routledge. 
 Rampley, Matthew (2000), The Remembrance of Things Past: On Aby M. Warburg and Walter Benjamin, Wiesbaden: Harrasowitz Verlag. 
 Richards, G. (2002), Putting Psychology in Its Place: A Critical Historical Overview, London: Routledge. 
 Semon, R. (1894), Zoologische Forschungsreisen in Australien und dem Malayischen Archipel, ausgeführt in den Jahren 1891-1893 von Prof. Dr. R. Semon, Erster Band: Ceratodus, Jena: Gustav Fischer.
 Semon, R. (1899), In the Australian Bush and on the Coast of the Coral Sea: Being the Experiences and Observations of a Naturalist in Australia, New Guinea and the Moluccas, London: Macmillan & Co.
 Semon, R. (1921), The Mneme, London: George Allen & Unwin.
 Semon, R. (1922), Die mnemischen Empfindungen in ihren Beziehungen zu den Originalempfindungen, Leipzig: Wilhelm Engelmann: (in German)
 Semon, R. (Duffy, B. trans.) (1923), Mnemic Psychology, London: George Allen & Unwin.
 von Linstow, O.F.B. (1898), "Nemathelminthen von Herrn Richard Semon in Australien gesammelt", Denkschriften der Medizinisch-Naturwissenschaftlichen Gesellschaft zu Jena, 8: 467–472: (in German)

1859 births
1918 suicides
19th-century German zoologists
20th-century German zoologists
Suicides in Germany